Pigmentiphaga soli is a gram-negative, motile bacterium from the genus Pigmentiphaga, which was isolated from soil in South Korea.

References

Burkholderiales
Bacteria described in 2011